Chantelle Izuka Hoyle (born 18 January 1996) is a Scottish actress. She began her career in theatre. She won a Scottish BAFTA for her performance in the film Boiling Point (2021). On television, she is known for her roles in the CW series The Outpost (2020–2021) and the Channel 4 sitcom Big Boys (2022–).

Early life
Hoyle was born in Edinburgh. Her sister Kimberly also acts and sings. Their father grew up in Edinburgh and has family from England; their Nigerian-born mother arrived in the UK when she was a teenager. Hoyle attended Cramond Primary School and then the Royal High School. She completed sixth form at the MGA Academy of Performing Arts before moving to London where she was awarded a scholarship to train at ArtsEd, graduating in 2017.

Career
Hoyle played Catherine Parr in the 2017 off West End production of Six: the Musical. The following year, she made her film debut as Mary Seton in the historical drama Mary Queen of Scots and her television debut in the second series of Clique. She also appeared in theatrical productions of The Selfish Giant and Sylvia. She then starred as Darrell Rivers on the UK tour of the musical adaptation of Malory Towers.

Hoyle joined the cast of the CW series The Outpost for its third and fourth seasons as Wren and had a small role as Dana in the Amazon Prime adaptation of The Wheel of Time. She appeared in the films Villain and Boiling Point, the latter of which earned her a Scottish BAFTA. As of 2022, Hoyle stars as Corinne in the Channel 4 sitcom Big Boys and has upcoming roles in the films Persuasion and Beach Boys.

Filmography

Film

Television

Stage

Awards and nominations

References

External links

Living people
1996 births
21st-century Scottish actresses
Actresses from Edinburgh
Black British actresses
People educated at the Arts Educational Schools
Scottish musical theatre actresses
Scottish people of English descent
Scottish people of Nigerian descent